Conversations with Eternity is a book by John Chambers, published from a series of notes by Victor Hugo. It "set out to present the Hugo family's table-turning seances in Marine-Terrace on the island of Jersey between 1853 and 1855". Chambers translated the original notes, which dealt with themes of spirituality.

References

External links
John Chambers' Conversations with Eternity - Debunking inaccuracies in the text
Excerpt from Conversations with Eternity
Description of Hugo's "channeling" of alchemist Nicholas Flamel

Victor Hugo
Jersey in fiction